This is the list of Bayernliga top scorers season by season since 1963–64.

Bayernliga North

Bayernliga South

Source:
 1 Peter Heyer scored 19 goals in the 2007–08 season but since Bambergs 1–0 win against Memmingen, where he scored, was later changed to a 0–x loss due to Bamberg using two non–eligible players, only 18 of his goals were officially recognised.

Top scorers
Germany Bayernliga
Association football player non-biographical articles